Paul Mbuya Oyuga (born 7 April 1973 in Nairobi) is a Kenyan professional football forward who currently plays for Norwegian team Ålgård FK.

Career
He has played club football for AFC Leopards, Connecticut Wolves, Örebro SK, Bryne FK, Sandnes Ulf and Ålgård FK. Oyuga has played 25 international matches for the Kenyan national team.

His brother, Stephen Oyuga, is currently playing as a defender at Campbell University in Buies Creek, North Carolina.

External links 
Club bio 

Weltfussball.de 

1973 births
Living people
Footballers from Nairobi
Kenyan footballers
Association football forwards
A.F.C. Leopards players
Connecticut Wolves players
USL First Division players
Örebro SK players
Bryne FK players
Sandnes Ulf players
Ålgård FK players
Allsvenskan players
Kenya international footballers
Kenyan expatriate footballers
Kenyan expatriate sportspeople in Norway
Kenyan expatriate sportspeople in Sweden
Kenyan expatriate sportspeople in the United States
Expatriate footballers in Norway
Expatriate footballers in Sweden
Expatriate soccer players in the United States